Eucithara gracilis is a small sea snail, a marine gastropod mollusk in the family Mangeliidae.

Description
The length of the shell attains 10 mm.

The ribs are narrow and distant. The interstices show very fine revolving striae. The color of the shell is whitish, with a central chestnut zone, and sometimes additional chestnut blotches.

Distribution
This marine species occurs off the Philippines, the Loyalty Islands and Queensland, Australia.

References

  Reeve, L.A. 1846. Monograph of the genus Mangelia. pls 1-8 in Reeve, L.A. (ed). Conchologia Iconica. London : L. Reeve & Co. Vol. 3.
 Cernohorsky, W.O. 1978. Tropical Pacific Marine Shells. Sydney : Pacific Publications 352 pp., 68 pls.

External links
  Tucker, J.K. 2004 Catalog of recent and fossil turrids (Mollusca: Gastropoda). Zootaxa 682:1-1295
 Kilburn R.N. 1992. Turridae (Mollusca: Gastropoda) of southern Africa and Mozambique. Part 6. Subfamily Mangeliinae, section 1. Annals of the Natal Museum, 33: 461–575
 
  Hedley, C. 1922. A revision of the Australian Turridae. Records of the Australian Museum 13(6): 213-359, pls 42-56

gracilis
Gastropods described in 1846